This is a list of songs in the music industry that have peaked at number-one on the Radio & Records singles chart in the 1990s.

1990

1991

1992

1993

1994

1995

1996

1997

1998

1999

See also
List of record charts

Notes

Radio
Unites States Radio and Records
1990s in American music